James A. "Jim" Graaskamp (1933–1988) was a professor and department chairman of real estate at the University of Wisconsin–Madison. He is credited with developing a multi-faceted ethics-based curriculum now widely used in teaching real estate.

Biography
Born in Milwaukee in 1933, Graaskamp was the son of Arnold G. and Lillian (Haufe) Graaskamp. His grandfather, Garret William Graaskamp, was born in Sheboygan County, Wisconsin, and his grandmother, Lavina Risseeuw, was born in the Netherlands (Ancestry.com, James A. Graaskamp Family Tree, retrieved January 16, 2015). At the age of 17, Graaskamp contracted polio and became a quadriplegic, forcing him to abandon a football scholarship to Harvard and seek a warmer climate for a time. 

In 1955, he earned a BA in English with a concentration in creative writing from Rollins College in Winter Park, Florida. He received an MBA in finance, with a specialization in security analysis, from Marquette University in Milwaukee, Wisconsin in 1957. In 1964, he earned a PhD in urban land economics and risk management from the University of Wisconsin–Madison.

He began teaching real estate at the University of Wisconsin in 1964 and continued until his death in 1988 at the age of 54, as which time he was chair of the department. He was survived by his long-time companion, Jean Davis. Graaskamp's devotion to students and intellectual oratory earned him legions of loyal student followers.

Graaskamp was a world traveler and determined to be as independent as possible. Every school year, he hired several students to live with him at his home on Breese Terrace, near Camp Randall, the University of Wisconsin football stadium. These students assisted Graaskamp with his personal care and traveled with him on trips including Alaska, Hawaii, Europe, and while deep sea fishing, he developed his own specialized tackle.

Graaskamp was one of the first to discuss the concept of "affordable housing". He successfully showed that the prevailing government sentiment of the time that commercial properties offered higher tax yields, and lower service demands created unnecessary barriers to building housing for those less well-off. His argument was that such housing is needed for both efficiency (workers live near work) and equity (everyone has a right to housing. Graaskamp demonstrated that restrictive land use regulations can stagnate communities as new residents, businesses and development are shut out. Graaskamp was a pioneer in accessible real estate, far ahead of the ADA, projects on which he worked with friend and fellow professor, Mike McBurney.

Contribution to real estate
In the 1970s, he began to advocate for an environmental ethic in real estate proceedings, recognizing that development has considerable and nearly irreversible impacts on the land. He also believed in the need for a social component to real estate deals, appreciating that the rights of private and public property owners are inextricably linked.

His theories meant a departure from typical real estate deals of the id-century, based on appraisals that reflected only narrow interests and were not always financially sound. Because any resulting failures hurt communities and small investors, Graaskamp began to advocate a much more comprehensive approach to feasibility analysis. His book, “A Guide to Feasibility Analysis”, is still used as a standard text today. During the savings & loan collapse of the 1990s, Graaskamp’s concerns were widely seen as vindicated.

By the time of his death, Graaskamp had firmly established the preeminence of the UW Real Estate Department at the University of Wisconsin and nationally. Graaskamp emphasized a multi-disciplinary approach to the curriculum, moving it from a traditional finance emphasis and instead incorporating an eclectic mix of classes in behaviorism, physical science, and business administration. He believed in preparing students to tackle complex, unstructured problems that didn’t lend themselves to neat academic models. Today, the Graaskamp approach is commonplace in most real estate schools.

In the mid-1980s in his home city of Madison, Wisconsin, he often inserted himself into major city/university discussions over the disposal of large downtown land tracts being vacated by railroad companies.

In 1982, James Graaskamp was named a trustee of the Urban Land Institute (ULI), a nonprofit education and research institute that promotes responsible land use. In 2004, James Graaskamp was one of ten “real estate legends” profiled in a book published by ULI, “Leadership Legacies.” Of the ten, Graaskamp was the sole academic.

The Urban Land Institute's textbook "Real Estate Development" now in its fifth edition, is dedicated to Professor Graaskamp.

Recent developments
In April 2007, the University of Wisconsin Center for Real Estate was officially renamed the  James A. Graaskamp Center for Real Estate as part of a $20 million alumni-led fundraising campaign. 

The James Graaskamp Landmark Research Collection at the University of Wisconsin was made public on October 25, 2007. It contains over 165 consulting reports from Landmark completed between the late 1960s to the early 1990s. There are appraisals, market and feasibility studies as well as other types of research and analysis.

On October 15, 1989, the City of Madison established James A. Graaskamp Park to honor the legacy of James Graaskamp. It was the first accessible playground in Wisconsin. The park is privately owned by the Madison Development Corporation, a workforce housing provider.

In August 2020 Madison Development Corporation (MDC), a nonprofit affordable workforce housing developer in Madison, WI dedicated "The Graaskamp Apartments" to Professor James A Graaskamp. The 44-unit building is located at 1946 E. Washington Ave in Madison WI and has an exercise room, leasing office, board room and underground parking. It also features universal design throughout with zero barrier entries (no steps) for all units, and roll in showers for all first-floor units. The top floor features a community room with an outdoor patio that overlooks the Graaskamp Park site, complete with a Red UW Memorial union Table & Chair set to honor the "Chief".  "The building is fully accessible to people of all mobility levels" per Lorrie Keating Heinemann, President & CEO of MDC. Source: The Cap Times, Oct. 4 ,2021.

References

External links
 The James Graaskamp Landmark Real Estate collection

University of Wisconsin–Madison faculty
University of Wisconsin–Madison alumni
1933 births
1988 deaths